Suleyman Reshidi (born Süleyman Həsən Oğlu Əliyev; 25 May 1927 – 21 February 2003) was an Azerbaijani dramatist.

Life 
Suleyman Reshidi was born on May 25, 1927 in the city of Nakhchivan. He moved to Baku in 1951 to continue his education, and in the same year he entered Azerbaijan Polytechnical Institute. He graduated from the institute in 1956 and successfully worked as an engineer for many years.

Work 
Suleyman Reshidi's creative work was a big part his life. Putting his writing activity parallel to engineering he successfully managed to combine the two very different professions. Because of that, Suleyman Reshidi was known as the engineer-dramatist in art circles.

Theatre Plays 
 The son of two mothers (İki ananın bir oğlu, 1960)
 I'm searching for her (Mən onu axtarıram)
 The Living Statue (Canlı heykəl, 1978)
 The Guest 
 A Pen
 Arzu fulfilled his wish
 The power of youth 
 The present
 Evil to goodness
 Second lieutenant 
 May peace be upon them all (Allah onlara rəhmət eləsin, 1992)
 My Ardabil (Mənim Ərdəbilim, 1995)

References 

1927 births
2003 deaths
Azerbaijani dramatists and playwrights
Azerbaijani screenwriters
20th-century screenwriters